Ikola may refer to:

Geography 
 Ikola, Finland, a former village in the former municipality Kivennapa, Finland
 Ikola, Tanzania, a ward in Mpanda District, Tanzania

People with the surname 
 Heikki Ikola (born 1947), Finnish biathlete
 Willard Ikola (born 1932), American ice hockey player